Talanovo is a rural locality (a village) in Kupreyevskoye Rural Settlement, Gus-Khrustalny District, Vladimir Oblast, Russia. The population was 443 as of 2010. There are 2 streets.

Geography 
Talanovo is located on the Kolp River, 63 km southeast of Gus-Khrustalny (the district's administrative centre) by road. Kolp is the nearest rural locality.

References 

Rural localities in Gus-Khrustalny District